Eupithecia correana is a moth in the family Geometridae. It is found in the regions of O'Higgins (Colchagua Province), Maule (Curico Province) and Araucania (Malleco Province) in Chile. The habitat consists of the Northern Valdivian Forest Biotic Province.

The length of the forewings is about 7.5 mm for males and 7-7.5 mm for females. The median area of the forewings is white or pale greyish white, contrasting with the dark brown basal area and faintly reddish brown distal area. The hindwings are greyish white, with dark brown scales basally and pale greyish brown scales distally. Adults have been recorded on wing in January and February.

Etymology
The specific name is based on the type locality.

References

Moths described in 1987
correana
Moths of South America
Endemic fauna of Chile